The term spotting is used in the motion-picture and video production industries to refer to the process of deciding where within a film the musical score and sound effects will be located, a process often referred to as "spotting for sound".  Spotting takes place after the director "locks" the film, an act which signifies their decision that no more shot changes will be made to the piece.  The results of spotting are "spotting sheets" which contain the time cues – organized by scene, shot, and time code reference – that will subsequently be useful to those artists contributing to the project's sound design.  After being locked and spotted, the cut goes into postproduction.

References

Cinematic techniques